Augusta Valentina Díaz de Rivera Hernández (born 10 January 1961) is a Mexican politician from the National Action Party. From 2009 to 2012 she served as Federal Deputy of the LXI Legislature of the Mexican Congress representing Puebla.

References

1961 births
Living people
People from Puebla (city)
Women members of the Chamber of Deputies (Mexico)
Members of the Chamber of Deputies (Mexico)
National Action Party (Mexico) politicians
21st-century Mexican politicians
21st-century Mexican women politicians